Bachir Yellès (12 September 1921 – 16 August 2022) was an Algerian painter.

Life and career
Yellès was born in Tlemcen on 12 September 1921. He studied at the School of  Fine Arts in Algiers, then the  Ecole de Beaux-Arts in Paris. He served as a director of the École supérieur des Beaux Arts d'Alger of Algiers, between the years 1960 and 1980. In his works, he continued using local themes but also experimented with Cubism, Expressionism, and Fauvism. Yellès turned 100 in September 2021. He died in Algiers on 16 August 2022.

References

Further reading
 Bloom, Jonathan and Sheila Blair. The Grove Encyclopedia of Islamic Art & Architecture. Oxford University Press, 2009. , 9780195309911.
 Collectif, Dominique Auzias, Jean-Paul Labourdette. Alger 2010–11 (City Guides Monde). Petit Futé, 3 June 2009. , 9782746937901.

External links 

 

1921 births
2022 deaths
20th-century Algerian painters
21st-century Algerian painters
Algerian artists
Algerian centenarians
Men centenarians
People from Tlemcen